Quchak (also romanized as Qūchak) is a village in Do Dehak Rural District, in the Central District of Delijan County, Markazi Province, Iran. In the 2006 census, its population was recorded to be 131, with 26 families.

References 

Populated places in Delijan County